Daniel Boéri (born 1 March 1944) is a Monegasque sociologist and politician. He served as a member of the National Council from 2013 to 2023, and is the author of several books.

References

Living people
1944 births
Knights of the Order of Cultural Merit (Monaco)
Members of the National Council (Monaco)